The Eldon River, part of the King River catchment, is a perennial river located in the West Coast region of Tasmania, Australia.

Course and features
The Eldon River rises on the slopes of the Eldon Range below Eldon Bluff, located to the east of the West Coast Range, and flows generally north, west and then south, before reaching its confluence with the South Eldon River and emptying into the King River, dammed to form Lake Burbury. The river descends  over its  course.

The Eldon River was a reference point for early-twentieth-century tracks in the region.

Patsy Crawford in her book about the King River describes the explorer diary of Charles Gould, who named features in the area.

See also

 Rivers of Tasmania

References

Western Tasmania
Rivers of Tasmania